Pekka Kemppi (30 July 1887, Jaakkima – 10 May 1957) was a Finnish shop assistant, stevedore, lumberjack, journalist, playwright and politician. He served as a Member of the Parliament of Finland from 1922 to 1923, representing the Socialist Workers' Party of Finland (SSTP). He was imprisoned on sedition charges in 1923.

References

1887 births
1957 deaths
People from Lakhdenpokhsky District
People from Viipuri Province (Grand Duchy of Finland)
Socialist Workers Party of Finland politicians
Members of the Parliament of Finland (1922–24)
Prisoners and detainees of Finland